The Senanayake family 
is a Sri Lankan family that is prominent in enterprise and politics. Along with many members who have been successful politician across generations, the family includes two Prime Ministers of Sri Lanka.

History
Don Spater from the village of Bothale became a successful mine owner. Making his fortune in graphite mining, he invested in  plantations and in the arrack renting franchise. He assumed the name Senanayake and was awarded the title of Mudaliyar by the colonial government. His sons continued his business ventures, and was in the forefront of the temperance movement that transitioned into the modern independence movement led by his sons Fredrick Richard Senanayake and Don Stephen Senanayake following the brutal suppression of the 1915 riots by the British. Don Stephen Senanayake who lead the negotiations with the British Government, was elected the first Prime Minister of Ceylon in 1947, having won the first Parliamentary elections after forming the United National Party. On his sudden death, while in office, his son Dudley Senanayake succeeded him as Prime Minister and went on to server several terms.

Family Tree
 Don Bartholomew
 Don Spater Senanayake (1848–1907), Mudaliyar + Dona Catherina Elizabeth Perera Gunasekera Senanayake (1848-?)
 Don Charles Senanayake (1878–1931) + Euphemia Grace Millicent
 Ivy Senanayake (1911–1984) + Dr Edmond Asoka Bulankulame (1900–1978)
 Visakha Bulankulame (1935–1999) + Tissa Wijeyeratne (1923–2002)
 Maria Frances Senanayake + Fredrik H. Dias Bandaranaike
 Effie Manthri Dias Bandaranaike + Sir John Kotelawala (divorced), Prime Minister of Ceylon, Member of Parliament, Member of State Council 
 Lakshmi Kotelawala + Henry Gerald Kotalawala
 Ranee Dias Bandaranaike + Shirly Alwis 
 Nita Dias Bandaranaike + Seneviratne  (divorced) 
 Ramachandra Dias Bandaranaike + Constance Don Carolis (divorced)  
 Fredrick Richard Senanayake (1882–1926), Member of the Colombo Municipal Council and independence activist + Ellen Attygalle
 Richard Gotabhaya Senanayake (1911–1970) Government Minister, Member of Parliament
 Phyllis Nedra "Girlie" Senanayake + Siripala Samarakkody,  Member of State Council of Ceylon
 Don Stephen Senanayake (1884–1952), Prime Minister of Ceylon, Member of Parliament, Member of State Council, Member of Legislative Council + Mollie Dunuwila Senanayake
 Dudley Senanayake (1911–1973), Prime Minister of Ceylon, Government Minister, Member of Parliament
 Robert Parakrama Senanayake (1913–1986) + Swarna Neela Senanayake (daughter of Fredrick Richard Senanayake)
 Ranjani Senanayake + Ranjith Wijewardene (of the Wijewardene family)
 Ruwan Wijewardene (1975- ), Cabinet Minister and Member of Parliament 
 Irushi Wijewardene (1972-) + Shastha Bulathsinhala 
 Shakun Bulathsinhala (2002-)
 Rukman Senanayake (1948- ), Assistant Leader of United National Party, Government Minister, Member of Parliament
 Ranjit Senanayake + Suwanitha
 Vasantha Senanayake (1973- ), Member of Parliament 

Other distant members of the family include;
 Wijewardene family
 Junius Richard Jayewardene
 Ranil Wickremesinghe
 Ranjan Wijeratne

Houses built by family
Bothale Walawwa
Woodlands, Colombo
Grassmere, Colombo

See also
List of political families in Sri Lanka

References
4. http://www.worldgenweb.org/lkawgw/gen3810.html